The Quinnipiac Bobcats women's ice hockey program represents Quinnipiac University. The Bobcats have competed in ECAC Hockey since the 2005-2006 season where they replaced Vermont when the Catamounts moved to Hockey East.  Prior to that season the Bobcats competed in College Hockey America for the 2004-2005 season, played as a Division I Independent for the 2002-2003 and 2003-2004 seasons, and in the ECAC Division I Eastern division for the 2001-2002 season.

The Bobcats play in the People's United Center (formerly the TD Bank Sports Center) in Hamden Connecticut.  The People's United Center hosted the NCAA Women's Frozen Four in 2014 and 2019.

Year by year

In their inaugural season (2001–02), the Quinnipiac Braves were in the ECAC Eastern Conference.  Effective 2002–03, the team's nickname was changed to the Bobcats. They played as a Division I independent that season and 2003–04. In 2004–05, the team played in the College Hockey America Conference . The following season, the Bobcats joined the ECAC where they still compete.

History
On February 28, 2010, Quinnipiac made NCAA history. Against the Rensselaer Engineers, the Bobcats lost by a score of 2–1, but it took five overtimes. It is now the longest college hockey game in NCAA history. Senior defenseman Laura Gersten had the game-winning goal. She registered it at 4:32 of the fifth overtime session to not only clinch the win, but the series victory. RPI advanced to the ECAC Hockey Women's Semifinals for the second consecutive season. The Engineers will face top ranked Cornell University.

On November 12 and 13, 2010, Kelly Babstock made Quinnipiac hockey history as she accounted for six of the seven goals scored over the weekend. Babstock registered back to back hat tricks against ECAC opponents (No. 10 ranked Harvard and Dartmouth). In addition, she is the first skater in Quinnipiac history to record two hat tricks in one season. As of November 14, Babstock led the team and the entire NCAA in goals (13) and points (27).

Versus the Brown Bears on Friday, December 3, 2010, Kelly Babstock became Quinnipiac's all-time leader in goals scored in a season by netting her 16th goal of the season. Babstock's nation leading sixth game-winning goal against Yale on Saturday, Dec. 4 was part of a Bobcats 3–1 win.

With a second period goal versus the Colgate Raiders on November 19, 2011, Kelly Babstock of the Quinnipiac Bobcats became the program's all-time leading scorer. In just her second season, Babstock surpassed Vicki Graham, who finished with 73 career points, after the 2006–07 season. Babstock reached the milestone in her 50th career game.

Kelly Babstock led all skaters in points at the 2011 Nutmeg Classic with four (one goal, three assists). With the two assists in the championship game, Babstock earned the 39 and 40 assists of her career, surpassing Caitlin Peters as the all-time assist leader in Bobcats history. Breann Frykas scored the game-winning goal as the Bobcats bested the Robert Morris Colonials by a 3–2 tally. The victory in the Nutmeg Classic was also the 200th career victory of head coach Rick Seeley.

Current roster
As of September 22, 2022.

International
The following players represented their countries in international tournaments. 
 Lexie Adzija, World U18 Championship bronze medalist
 Taryn Baumgardt, World U18 Championship player
 Nicole Connery, World U18 Championship player
 Sarah-Ève Coutu-Godbout, World U18 Championship silver medalist
 Breann Frykas, World U18 Championship silver medalist
 Nanna Holm Glaas, five-time World Championship player (DI and DII)
 Anna Kilponen, Olympian, five-time World Championship and three-time World U18 Championship player
 Nicole Kosta, World U18 Championship player
 Hayley McMeekin,  U22 Selects, 2008 European Air Canada Cup
 Cydney Roesler, World U18 Championship gold and silver medalist
 Erica Udén Johansson, three-time Olympian and five-time World Championship player

Awards and honors
Sydney Rossman (born 1995), in her junior year Rossman was named the ECAC Hockey Goaltender of the year, an ECAC Hockey Player of the Year Finalist, and the most outstanding player of the 2016 ECAC Hockey Tournament and All-Tournament.
Kelly Babstock, 2010–11 New England Women's Division I All-Star
Heather Hughes, ECAC Rookie of the Week (Week of November 9, 2009)
Heather Hughes, 2009–10 ECAC All-Rookie Team
Rick Seeley, 2009–10 ECAC Coach of the Year
Rick Seeley, 2009–10 New England Hockey Writers All-Star Team (Coach)
Victoria Vigilanti, ECAC Defensive Player of the Week (Week of October 19, 2009)
Victoria Vigilanti, ECAC Defensive Player of the Week (Week of February 22, 2010)
Victoria Vigilanti, 2009–10 ECAC Leader, Save percentage (.957)
Victoria Vigilanti, Ranked second in 2009–10 ECAC season, Goals against average (1.15)
Victoria Vigilanti, 2009–10 ECAC All-Rookie Team
Victoria Vigilanti, 2009–10 All-ECAC First Team
Victoria Vigilanti, 2009–10 ECAC Goaltender of the Year
Victoria Vigilanti, 2009–10 New England Hockey Writers All-Star Team
Hughes and Vigilanti made school history. It marks the first time in women's hockey history at the school that two players both received postseason honours in the same year. In addition, it marked the first time since the 2006–07 season that a player from the Bobcats received a postseason honour.

ECAC Awards

ECAC Weekly Awards
Catie Boudiette, Adirondack Health Rookie of the Week (Awarded February 22, 2021)

ECAC All-Rookie Team
Kate Reilly, 2019-20 ECAC All-Rookie Team Selection

Team Awards
Kelly Babstock, 2010–11 Quinnipiac women's ice hockey Rookie of the Year 
Kelly Babstock, 2010–11 Quinnipiac women's ice hockey Most Valuable Player
Kallie Flor, 2010 Most Valuable Player
Kelsey Britton, 2010 Coaches Award
Jordan Elkins, 2010 Top Defensive Player
Victoria Vigilanti, 2010 Rookie of the Year

Bobcats in elite hockey
A number of Huskies alumnae have pursued post-collegiate ice hockey careers in elite leagues around the world. In North America, Huskies have played in leagues and organizations including the Canadian Women's Hockey League (CWHL; 2007–2019), the Premier Hockey Federation (PHF since 2021; founded in 2015 as NWHL), and the Professional Women's Hockey Players Association (PWHPA; founded in 2019). Additionally, many alumnae have played in international leagues including the DEBL, the German Women's Hockey League (DFEL), the European Women's Hockey League (EWHL), the Swedish Women's Hockey League (SDHL), and the Zhenskaya Hockey League (ZhHL). 

The following list is not exhaustive, please assist by contributing missing content.

See also
 Quinnipiac Bobcats men's ice hockey

References

External links
Bobcats women's ice hockey

 
Ice hockey teams in Connecticut